Gleb Viktorovich Klimenko (born July 28, 1983) is a Russian former professional ice hockey winger. He played in the Kontinental Hockey League (KHL) from 2008 to 2017.

Career statistics

Regular season and playoffs

References

External links
 

1983 births
Living people
Ak Bars Kazan players
Amur Khabarovsk players
Atlant Moscow Oblast players
Avtomobilist Yekaterinburg players
GKS Tychy (ice hockey) players
HC Neftekhimik Nizhnekamsk players
HC Spartak Moscow players
HC Vityaz players
Metallurg Magnitogorsk players
Russian ice hockey left wingers
Severstal Cherepovets players
SKA Saint Petersburg players